Melissa Armstrong (born September 18, 1990, in Saskatoon, Saskatchewan) is a Canadian baseball player. She is a member of the Canada women's national baseball team which won a silver medal at the 2015 Pan American Games.

Playing career

Baseball
Armstrong made her debut with the Canadian national team prior to her senior year of high school. Of note, she has competed in five IBAF Women's World Cups (2008, 2010, 2012, 2014, 2016).
Competing with Team Alberta, she helped the squad capture the gold medal at the 2014 Senior Women's Invitational (also known as the Canadian women's baseball championships).

Personal
Aside from baseball, Armstrong attended the UoS to receive an undergraduate degree in history and political studies, a master's degree in African studies from Oxford University and a PhD in history from Carleton University. She is currently in medical school at the University of Saskatchewan.

She just married Benjamin

References

1990 births
Sportspeople from Saskatoon
Canadian female baseball players
Baseball people from Saskatchewan
Living people
Baseball players at the 2015 Pan American Games
Pan American Games silver medalists for Canada
Pan American Games medalists in baseball
Medalists at the 2015 Pan American Games
20th-century Canadian women
21st-century Canadian women